Catari was the name of a tribe belonging to the Venetic peoples that are sometimes confused with Illyrians.

See also
Veneti (disambiguation)
Veneti (Gaul)
Reitia
Ancient peoples of Italy
Prehistoric Italy

References 

Adriatic Veneti
Ancient peoples of Italy